Helge Aune (born 6 September 1973) is a retired Norwegian football defender.

He played for Rosenborg BK and the Norwegian under-21 national team early in his career. In 1995, he joined Bodø/Glimt. However, he was often injured, and never fully broke into the first team. He retired as an active player after the 2000 season. In 2004 and 2005 he coached Ålgård FK.

References

1973 births
Living people
Norwegian footballers
Rosenborg BK players
FK Bodø/Glimt players
Norwegian football managers
Eliteserien players

Association football defenders